F69 may refer to:F69
 Air Park-Dallas Airport, in Collin County, Texas
 , a Leander-class frigate of the Royal New Zealand Navy
 , a Leander-class frigate of the Royal Navy
 , a passenger ferry requisitioned for the Royal Navy